John Gunby (March 10, 1745 – May 17, 1807) was an American planter and soldier from Somerset County, Maryland, who is considered by many to be "one of the most gallant officers of the Maryland Line under Gen. Smallwood".  He entered service volunteering as a minuteman in 1775 and fought for the American cause until the end earning praise as probably the most brilliant soldier whom Maryland contributed to the War of Independence.  Gunby was also the grandfather of Senator Ephraim King Wilson II.

Early life 
The Gunby family arrived in Maryland around 1660, coming from Yorkshire, England, and settling in Queen Anne's County.  Around 1710, his grandfather moved the family to Somerset County to a farm at Gunby's Creek, an inlet of Pocomoke Bay, near present-day Crisfield where John Gunby was born on March 10, 1745.  During his youth, Gunby had many opportunities to deal with persons from different social classes as the Gunby home was considered a rendezvous for the people of the neighboring country and the family exercised substantial influence due to their large land holdings and sea vessels with which they engaged in coastal trade.

In the spring of 1775, at the age of 30, Gunby volunteered as a minuteman, for which his father, a staunch loyalist, warned him that he was running the risk of being hanged as a traitor. John Gunby is said to have replied:

Early War 
When the Revolution began, Gunby joined the American forces and formed an independent military company at his own expense. The equipping and maintaining of this company, which was among the first to be organized, cost Gunby most of his wealth. The company, including officers, numbered a hundred and three men.  On January 2, 1776, he was elected captain of the 2nd Independent Maryland Company – Somerset County.

In the early part of the War, Gunby's company spent much of their time patrolling southern Maryland and breaking up Tory camps which were to be found on the lower part of the peninsula as Somerset County was a leading Tory stronghold.  On August 16, 1776, the 2nd Independent Maryland Company was ordered north to join General George Washington's army as part of Maryland's quota of troops towards the Continental Army.

Although specific information is lacking, it is known that the 2nd Independent Maryland Company under Gunby's command participated in the following battles/campaigns:

In all of these battles, Gunby commanded the 2nd Independent Maryland Company first as a captain until December 10, 1776, when he was commissioned as lieutenant colonel and then as a full colonel when he was promoted on April 17, 1777

Southern Campaign 
After the unsuccessful attempt to capture Savannah, Georgia, under the command of General Benjamin Lincoln, the Southern Department of the Continental Army retreated to Charleston, South Carolina.  General Sir Henry Clinton moved his forces, surrounded the city where Lincoln's army had taken refuge and cut off any chance of relief for the Continental Army.  Prior to his surrender, Lincoln had been able to get messages to General Washington and the Continental Congress requesting aid.  At the end of April 1780, Washington dispatched General deKalb with 1,400 Maryland and Delaware troops.  The Maryland Line made up a large portion of this force.

General deKalb's forces took almost a month to descend the Chesapeake Bay and did not arrive in Petersburg, Virginia, until the middle of June, almost a month after Lincoln had surrendered his army.  The Continental Congress appointed Horatio Gates to command the Southern Department.  He assumed command on July 25, 1780, and immediately marched into South Carolina with the intent of engaging the British Army, now under the command of Charles Cornwallis.

Battle of Camden 

After brief aggressive maneuvering which threatened the British position in the Carolinas, Cornwallis moved his forces to engage the American forces.  The two armies engaged one another in the Battle of Camden on August 16, 1780, six miles north of Camden, South Carolina.  Due to several tactical errors on the part of Horatio Gates, the British were able to achieve a decisive victory.  The Maryland Troops, Gunby's company among them, deserted by their commander fought until they were pressed on all sides and forced to retreat.  Two-fifths of the Marylanders were killed or wounded and General deKalb was mortally wounded.  Prior to his death three days later, deKalb paid a glowing tribute to the Maryland Troop under his command.

Battle of Cowpens 

Nathanael Greene was appointed commander of the Southern Department on October 5, 1780, and assumed command on December 2, 1780.  In early January 1781, Greene detached four companies of the 1st Maryland Regiment, to reinforce Daniel Morgan's forces.  On January 17, 1781, Morgan's newly reinforced army engaged a significantly larger British force under the command of Banastre Tarleton and won a decisive victory.

Gunby was in command of his company as they charged the British 71st Regiment.  The British force was completely routed and Lieutenant Colonel Howard is said to have collected seven swords surrendered to him by British officers.

Battle of Guilford Court House 

After the successful retreat across the Dan River, General Greene chose to offer battle to General Cornwallis's forces on March 15, 1781, on ground of his own choosing at Guliford Court House, inside the city limits of present-day Greensboro, North Carolina.

After the British forces had broken Greene's first line made up of North Carolina Militia and the second line made up of Virginia Militia, they threatened the third line made up by the 1st Maryland Regiment, under the command of Gunby, and the 2nd Maryland Regiment.  The Brigade of Guards, under the command of a Colonel Stewart, broke through the 2nd Maryland Regiment, captured two field pieces and threatened the rear of Gunby's forces, who were already engaged with sizable force under the command of a Colonel Webster.

Gunby, his command threatened on two fronts, ordered a fierce charge and swept Webster's forces from the field.  He then wheeled his troops to face the oncoming guards unit.  After a brief exchange of musket fire, in which Gunby's horse was shot from under him, the 1st Maryland Regiment charged the Guards unit, who were quickly routed.

Greene, not able to see this part of the battle from his vantage point, had already ordered a retreat.  Thus, unsupported, the Maryland troops were soon forced to withdraw.

The Battle of Hobkirk's Hill 

After Guilford Court House, Cornwallis's force was spent and in great need of supply.  He therefore moved his army towards Wilmington, North Carolina where he had previously ordered supplies to be sent.  Greene pursued the British force for a short time before deciding to take his forces into South Carolina.  Greene hoped that by threatening the British garrisons in the state he could force Cornwallis to pursue him and then engage the British on ground favorable to his army.  When Cornwallis did not pursue the Continental Army, Greene chose to reduce the British garrisons scattered throughout South Carolina in order to force the British back into Charleston.

To this end, General Greene moved his main force—made up of two Virginia and two Maryland regiments of Continentals as well as a force of Cavalry under William Washington—with all possible speed towards Camden, South Carolina where Lord Francis Rawdon was stationed with 900 troops. Rawdon learned of Greene's approach and readied his forces to repel an attack.  Upon arriving at Camden, and finding his planned assault impractical, Greene retired his forces to a low heavily wooded ridge locally called Hobkirk's Hill.

Having received intelligence from a deserter on April 24 that the Continental Artillery and Militia had been detached from Greene's main force, Rawdon decided to attack.  However, on the morning of April 25, 1781 Lieutenant Colonel Carrington had brought the artillery back to Hobkirk's Hill along with a supply of provisions which were distributed to the Continental troops.  At around 11 am, while many of the Continentals were occupied with cooking and washing clothes, the advanced pickets detected the British forces who had gained the American left by marching a circuit of great distance and keeping close to a swamp that was next to the ridge occupied by the Continental Army.

The advanced pickets, under Captain Robert Kirkwood, were able to delay the British advance giving Greene time to give orders and address his forces distribution.  Greene placed the a Virginia Regiment under Lieutenant Colonel Campbell on the extreme right with another Virginia Regiment under Lieutenant Colonel Samuel Hawes to their left.  On the extreme left, Greene placed the 5th Maryland under Lieutenant Colonel Benjamin Ford with the 1st Maryland, under Gunby's command, to their right.  The artillery was placed in the center with North Carolina militia in the rear.

Once having extricated his forces from the woods and forcing the pickets to retreat, Rawdon arrayed his forces and slowly advanced up the ridge towards the waiting Continentals.  Greene, perceiving the British forces were presenting a narrow front, ordered an attack.  Greene instructed Campbell on the right to wheel his men to the left and engage the British on their flank with Ford to take his men and make a similar movement on the left.  Greene ordered the two remaining regiments in the center to advance with bayonets and confront the enemy head on while Washington was to take his cavalry around the British left flank and attack the enemy in the rear.

During the advance of the 1st Maryland on the British left, Captain William Beatty jr. who was in command on the right of Gunby's regiment, was killed causing his company to stop their advance.  Gunby ordered his men to stop their advance and fall back with the intention of reforming their line.  At this time, Benjamin Ford of the 5th Maryland was mortally wounded throwing his troops into disorder.  Finding their flank in disarray and being threatened by a company of Irish troops Rawdon had brought up to strengthen his flank, the Maryland troops rallied briefly to fire a few rounds and then left the field in disorder.  Seeing this, Rawdon quickly rallied his flagging troops and advanced, taking the field.

Court of inquiry 
The day after the Battle of Hobkirk's Hill, General Greene addressed his troops and presented a pointed comment that Gunby apparently felt this was directed at him and he immediately applied for a court of inquiry to review his actions on the field.  His request was granted by General Greene who named General Huger, Colonel Harrison of the artillery and Lieutenant Colonel Washington of the cavalry to conduct the review.

On May 2, the Court published their conclusions:

Greene was firm in his belief that Gunby was the sole reason for the Continental Army's loss at Hobkirk Hill.  On August 6, 1781, in a letter to Joseph Reed, Greene stated his position bluntly:

Henry Lee, "Light Horse Harry", gave a different opinion in his memoirs of the war stating that the Maryland troops abandoned their position contrary to the efforts and example of Gunby and the other Continental officers on the field.

It has been pointed out that the tribunal paid no disrespect to Colonel Gunby, pointing out his "spirit and activity"; however, it clearly found him at fault for making an error in military tactics.  Both the tribunal's and Greene's assertion that Gunby's order to his regiment to retire and reform was the sole cause for the Continental line breaking does not take into account that the two companies on Gunby's right had already broken the line and were falling back in confusion upon the death of Captain Beatty.  The historian Benson John Lossing attributes the entire loss of victory to the death of Captain Beatty.

Nor did the tribunal or Greene appear to accept that Gunby's order for the four companies that were still advancing to reform their line to be a proper military tactic. Henry Lee, however, points out that this same maneuver had been performed by Daniel Morgan at Cowpens.

In addition, as mentioned in the tribunal's report, Gunby was apparently successful in rallying his troops who then fired one or two rounds at the oncoming British soldiers which would seem to indicate that the Maryland troops were not panicked as Greene's comments, the tribunal's report and Henry Lee's account seem to allude.

Lee offers another reason for the American defeat at Hobkirk's Hill, suggesting that Greene's order to the Cavalry under Williams to circle around the British and attack them in the rear was a plausible explanation for the loss.  As explained in his memoirs, if the Cavalry had been held in reserve, rather than order to attack the rear of the British force where they were held up by Rowsan's baggage train, William's troops could have been used to reinforce the line and reversing the gains made by the British reserve that had already been committed to the battle.

Regardless that both the tribunal and Greene found fault with Gunby for his actions at Hobkirk Hill, Gunby was retained as commander of the 1st Maryland Regiment.

Later war 
The Maryland Line continued to distinguish itself in the later battles of the Southern theater of the American Revolutionary War with Gunby continuing to command the 1st Maryland Regiment.

Of the Maryland Line's actions at the Battle of Eutaw Springs, General Greene wrote in his official report of the engagement:

Gunby continued in the capacity of commander of the 1st Maryland Regiment until the regiment was furloughed and all of its business concluded.  Prior to his resigning his commission, he was given a brevet promotion to brigadier general on September 30, 1783.

Life after war 
After mustering out of the Continental Army, Gunby returned home to Somerset County, Maryland.  His father, who died in 1788, bequeathed him a large farm in Worcester County, Maryland, two miles south of Snow Hill.  Unlike many of his contemporaries, Gunby avoided politics or using his fame from the war for personal gain.  He kept to his farm devoting himself to agriculture.  For some years he supported at least three families of Maryland officers killed during the Carolina Campaigns.  Gunby was also known to help poor families build houses and awaiting their convenience for payment, promoting the construction of new roads, furnishing horse teams for those in need and contributing toward the maintenance of places of worship. Brigadier General Gunby was admitted as an original member of the Society of the Cincinnati of Maryland.

Footnotes

References 
Judge J. Harry Covington, address before the Eastern Shore Society of Baltimore City Circa 1939
Gunby, Andrew Augustus Colonel John Gunby of the Maryland Line The Robert Clarke Company 1902
Archives of Maryland – Muster Rolls of Service of Maryland Troops in the American Revolution
Heitman, Francis B. Historical Register of Officers of the Continental Army during the War of the Revolution. New, enlarged, and revised edition. Washington, D.C.: Rare Book Shop Publishing Company, 1914.
Greene, Francis Vinton D. General Greene Appleton and Company 1893
Marshall, John Life of George Washington Second Edition J. Crissy 1836
Lee III, Henry Memoirs of the War in the Southern Department of the United States P. Force 1827
Scharf, John Thomas History of Maryland: From the Earliest Period to the Present Day J. B. Piet 1879
Lossing, Benson John  The American Revolution and the War of 1812 New York Book Concern 1875
Metcalf, Bryce Original Members and Other Officers Eligible to the Society of the Cincinnati, 1783–1938: With the Institution, Rules of Admission, and Lists of the Officers of the General and State Societies. Strasburg, VA: Shenandoah Publishing House, Inc. 1938

External links 
 The Society of the Cincinnati
 The American Revolution Institute

1745 births
1807 deaths
Continental Army officers from Maryland
American people of English descent
People of Maryland in the American Revolution
Continental Army generals
American planters
People from Crisfield, Maryland
People from Somerset County, Maryland